Gary Solomon may refer to:

Gary Solomon (New Zealand cricketer), New Zealand cricketer
Gary Solomon (Sint Maarten cricketer), Sint Maarten cricketer